A garment bag  or suit bag  is a container of flexible material, usually used to ease transporting suits, jackets or clothing in general, and also to protect clothes from dust by hanging them inside with their hangers and then in the closet bar. The simplest models usually have a zipper that opens from top to bottom, in the middle of one side. They can be manufactured with different materials: fabric, leather, plastic, etc...

Some models of garment bags may have a strap for holding them on the shoulder and quite often, some type of handle. They come in different shapes and sizes depending on the length of the clothes that should contain (jackets, coats, dresses, etc...). There is a type of garment bag , with two handles, that can be folded by the middle for easy carrying it with one hand.

Garment bags protect clothing from dust, dirt and smells. They help to keep clothes in good condition whether traveling or hanging in wardrobe. Some have an identification window to allow inspecting their contents.

Dangers 
Garment bags made of thin plastic are a risk to children who might play with them due to risk of death by asphyxiation.

See also 
 Costume
 Bag
 Suitcase

References 

Bags